Colin Shaw may refer to:

 Colin Shaw (rugby union, born 1902) (1902–1976), rugby union player who represented Australia
 Colin Shaw (New Zealand footballer), former football (soccer) player who represented New Zealand at international level in the 1960s
 Colin Shaw (Australian footballer) (born 1950), Australian rules footballer
 Colin Shaw (canoeist) (born 1954), Canadian sprint canoer
 Colin Shaw (rugby union, born 1983), Scotland 7s international rugby union player